Lucie Žáčková (born 16 February 1978) is a Czech film and stage actress. She won the Young Talent award at the 2003 Thalia Awards and 2003 Alfréd Radok Awards. She won the Czech Lion award for Best Supporting Actress in 2015 for her role in the film The Snake Brothers.

Žáčková is a born-again Christian.

Selected filmography 
The City of the Sun (2005)
Zoufalci (2009)
Revival (2013)
The Snake Brothers (2015)

References

External links

1982 births
Living people
Czech film actresses
Czech stage actresses
Czech television actresses
Actors from Ostrava
21st-century Czech actresses
Czech Christians
Recipients of the Thalia Award